Brise soleil, sometimes brise-soleil, is an architectural feature of a building that reduces heat gain within that building by deflecting sunlight. More recently, vertical Brise soleil have become popular. Both systems allow low-level sun to enter a building in the mornings, evenings and during winter but cut out direct light during summer.

Architecture
Brise-soleil can comprise a variety of permanent sun-shading structures, ranging from the simple patterned concrete walls popularized by Le Corbusier in the Palace of Assembly to the elaborate wing-like mechanism devised by Santiago Calatrava for the Milwaukee Art Museum or the mechanical, pattern-creating devices of the Institut du Monde Arabe by Jean Nouvel.

In the typical form, a horizontal projection extends from the sunside facade of a building. This is most commonly used to prevent facades with a large amount of glass from overheating during the summer. Often louvers are incorporated into the shade to prevent the high-angle summer sun falling on the facade, but also to allow the low-angle winter sun to provide some passive solar heating.

Gallery

See also
Awning
Green building
List of low-energy building techniques
Mashrabiya
Pergola
Sudare

References

External links

Brise soleil at the Milwaukee Art Museum
 (Brise Soleil Commercial Applications)
British-Yemini Society Influence of climate on window design
 (demonstration of Brise Soleil in commercial applications)
AD Classics: AD Classics: Palace of the Assembly / Le Corbusier
Technical possibilities (in German)
Museum of everyday culture (in German)
 (Further reading on Brise Soleil from a supplier)

Architectural elements
Low-energy building
Articles containing video clips
Shading (Architecture)